Rusmin Dedić (born 11 September 1982) is a former Slovenian footballer who played as a defender.

External links
PrvaLiga profile 

1982 births
Living people
People from Zvornik
Slovenian footballers
Association football defenders
NK Rudar Velenje players
NK Olimpija Ljubljana (1945–2005) players
ND Gorica players
Slovenian PrvaLiga players
Slovenian expatriate footballers
Expatriate footballers in Ukraine
Slovenian expatriate sportspeople in Ukraine